The 2005 Chinese Super League Cup (Chinese: 2005中国足球协会超级联赛杯) was the second and the last edition of Chinese Super League Cup.

Results

First round

First leg

Second leg

Second round

First leg

Second leg

Semi-finals

First leg

Second leg

Final

First leg

Second leg

See also
2005 Chinese FA Cup

References

2005 in Chinese football
2005 domestic association football cups